Kenneth Ray Dilger (born February 2, 1971) is an American former professional football player who was a tight end in the National Football League (NFL).

Early years
Ken Dilger was raised in Mariah Hill, Spencer County, Indiana. He attended Heritage Hills High School in Lincoln City, Indiana where he played quarterback; he also starred in basketball and baseball.  After graduating from Heritage Hills, he went on to the University of Illinois where he was redshirted for a year (1990) before becoming a four-year letterman and three-year starter as a tight end.  He was named All-Big Ten in 1991 (Honorable Mention) by the Big Ten coaches and in 1994 (2nd Team) by the coaches and media.  He graduated from Illinois with a degree in marketing. He is husband to Heidi, aka THE Banana Bread-crack baker;

In 2022, he was selected for induction into the Indiana Football Hall of Fame.

1991: 18 catches for 212 yards with 1 TD
1992:  6 catches for  42 yards with 0 TD
1993: 17 catches for 212 yards with 2 TD
1994: 48 catches for 607 yards with 6 TD

Professional career

Ken Dilger spent his first 7 NFL seasons as a tight end with the Indianapolis Colts (1995–2001) and his last three seasons with the Tampa Bay Buccaneers (2002–2004); winning Super Bowl XXXVII in his first year as a Buccaneer.  Throughout his career, he accumulated career totals of 356 catches, 4,099 yards (11.5), and 24 touchdowns. In the final game of his career, in addition to playing tight end, he was the long snapper, because the team's regular long snapper, Dave Moore, had been injured the previous week.

NFL career statistics

References

1971 births
Living people
People from Spencer County, Indiana
Players of American football from Indiana
American football tight ends
Illinois Fighting Illini football players
Indianapolis Colts players
Tampa Bay Buccaneers players
American Conference Pro Bowl players